The 2009 Pub Charity Sevens tournament was held in Queenstown, New Zealand, between 10 and 11 January 2009. It was the sixth New Zealand National Rugby Sevens Tournament to be held in Queenstown. Auckland were the defending champions, having previously won the tournament four consecutive times.

Pool stages

Pool A
  Auckland
  Canterbury
  Wellington
  Otago Country

Pool B
  Counties Manukau
  North Harbour
  Northland
  Southland

Pool C
  Taranaki
  Bay of Plenty
  Hawke's Bay
  West Coast

Pool D
  Otago
  Manawatu
  Waikato
  Horowhenua-Kapiti

Knockout

Shield
 Southland 28-21  Northland

Bowl
 Otago 33-10  Horowhenua-Kapiti

Plate
 Wellington 38-33  Taranaki

Cup

 North Harbour 29-26  Counties Manukau

External links
 Official Site

Pub Charity Sevens
New Zealand National Rugby Sevens Tournament
Pub